Michael Wayne Duberry (born 14 October 1975) is an English former professional footballer who played as a centre-back.

He started his career with Premier League side Chelsea, and also played in the top flight for Leeds United and Reading, and in the Scottish Premier League for St Johnstone. He has also previously played in the Football League for Bournemouth, Stoke City, Wycombe Wanderers and Oxford United before finishing his career with Non-league side Hendon.

Club career

Chelsea
Duberry attended Enfield Grammar School in London and started his career at Chelsea where he was a trainee and made his debut during the 1993–94 season, before a brief loan period with Bournemouth. Duberry made a total of 115 appearances for Chelsea and scored 3 goals, including one in a 2–1 win over Manchester United at Old Trafford in November 1996. His two other Chelsea goals came in their 1995–96 FA Cup campaign, with goals against Grimsby Town and Wimbledon. He won the League Cup, the UEFA Cup Winners' Cup and the European Super Cup with Chelsea, all in 1998, but faced stiff competition for a place in the side from the likes of Marcel Desailly and Frank Leboeuf. Duberry picked up an Achilles tendon injury in January 1997 meaning he missed the rest of that season, including the 1997 FA Cup Final.

Leeds United
Seeking regular football, Duberry eventually requested a transfer and moved to Leeds United in June 1999 for £4.5 million. However, he again failed to break into the first team, as the likes of Jonathan Woodgate, Dominic Matteo, Lucas Radebe and Rio Ferdinand took Leeds to the Champions League semi-finals. He did play the full 90 minutes of their memorable 1–0 win over AC Milan at Elland Road during that campaign; however, this would prove to be his last appearance of that season in any competition. He was involved in a court case with Leeds teammates Jonathan Woodgate and Lee Bowyer. The first season in which he played regularly for Leeds was 2003–04, as by this time Lucas Radebe had become increasingly injury-prone and crippling debt had forced the sales of Ferdinand and Woodgate. However, Duberry failed to impress in a defence often made up of loan signings (such as Zoumana Camara and Didier Domi) and then youth-team players (such as Frazer Richardson and Matthew Kilgallon).

Stoke City
When Leeds were relegated to the Football League he stayed on for a season until Leeds manager Kevin Blackwell allowed him to move to Stoke City where he went on to become a first-team regular and club captain. All 80 of his appearances for the club were as a starter; not once did he feature on the bench. He scored once for Stoke, in a 2–0 win over Crewe Alexandra.

Reading

On 31 January 2007, Duberry signed for Reading, who invoked a clause in his contract that allowed him to leave Stoke for a Premier League club if a set fee was received, rumoured to be in the region of £800,000. He made his league debut for Reading on 24 February in a 2–1 defeat away to Middlesbrough.

Wycombe Wanderers
On 15 May 2009, Reading announced that they would not be renewing Duberry's contract, and on 10 July he signed a two-year contract with Wycombe Wanderers, being appointed club captain shortly afterwards. He was released from his contract on 1 February 2010 having seen his contract terminated by mutual consent, according to the official Wycombe Wanderers website.

St Johnstone
Four days later, Duberry signed for Scottish side St Johnstone. He made his Saints debut in a 1–0 Scottish Cup defeat to Dundee United. He scored his first goal for St Johnstone in a 2–2 draw with St Mirren on 17 April 2010. Duberry re-signed a further one-year deal with St Johnstone on 27 May.

Oxford United
Duberry joined Oxford United on 1 June 2011 on a two-year deal, to be closer to his family. He scored his first goal for the club, in a 2–1 victory over Port Vale, on 29 October. On 21 January 2012, Duberry scored two own goals followed by a last-minute equaliser as Oxford drew 2–2 with Hereford United. In August, 36-year-old Duberry underwent neck surgery in an attempt to prolong his career, and stated his hopes of a return to fitness within four months. He made two substitute appearances in December and returned to the starting line-up in a league fixture on 1 January 2013. He was released by Oxford at the end of the 2012–13 season having made 50 appearances for the club in two seasons.

Hendon
Duberry announced that he had signed a week-to-week deal with non-league Hendon on 9 August 2013. After just 4 games, and 16 days with the Greens, he was released, and announced his retirement from football on 2 October.

International career
Duberry was eligible to play international football for England, through birth and Montserrat, as both his parents were born there. He stated that Ruel Fox had asked him earlier in his career if he wanted to play for the Montserrat national football team, but declined as he stated his dream was to play for England. Duberry was approached again, later in his career, whilst playing for St Johnstone. However, he declined again despite the team training in Enfield, close to where he grew up.

Personal life 
After retiring as a player, Duberry began Made Leaders, a mentoring, coaching and leadership business.

Career statistics

A.  The "Other" column constitutes appearances and goals in the Football League play-offs and Football League Trophy.

Honours
Chelsea
Football League Cup: 1997–98
UEFA Cup Winners' Cup: 1997–98
UEFA Super Cup: 1998

References

External links

England profile at theFA

1975 births
Living people
Footballers from Enfield, London
English footballers
England under-21 international footballers
Association football defenders
Chelsea F.C. players
AFC Bournemouth players
Leeds United F.C. players
Stoke City F.C. players
Reading F.C. players
Wycombe Wanderers F.C. players
St Johnstone F.C. players
Oxford United F.C. players
Hendon F.C. players
Premier League players
English Football League players
People educated at Enfield Grammar School
Black British sportsmen
British people of Montserratian descent